Sonoran News is a free newspaper in Cave Creek, Arizona, United States. With a circulation of over 37,000, it is the most widely read community newspaper in Maricopa County. It is distributed in Cave Creek, Carefree, Scottsdale, north Phoenix and Desert Hills. It is considered a conservative values newspaper, and bills itself as the "conservative voice of Arizona."

In 2010, the downturn in the economy pushed the formerly weekly newspaper to a twice-monthly publishing schedule.

Controversies 

In 2002, the publisher of the Sonoran News was accused of cybersquatting on the domain of a rival newspaper to reduce its findability.

In 2009, the Sonoran News successfully defended itself against a libel lawsuit from rival paper The Desert Advocate, which the Sonoran News had referred to as the "Deadbeat Advocate", citing the owner's non-payment of back taxes.

References

External links
 

Newspapers published in Arizona
Conservative media in the United States